The pied worm snake (Indotyphlops leucomelas) is a species of snake in the Typhlopidae family.

References

Indotyphlops
Reptiles described in 1890